A Nintendo Game Card is a proprietary flash storage-based format used to physically distribute video games for certain Nintendo systems. The game cards resemble both smaller and thinner versions of Hudson's HuCard, the storage medium for the PC-Engine, and the Game Pak ROM cartridges used for previous portable gaming consoles released by Nintendo, such as the Game Boy and Game Boy Advance. The mask ROM chips are manufactured by Macronix and have an access speed of 150 ns.

Nintendo DS

Nintendo DS Game Card 

Cards for the Nintendo DS ranged from 64 megabits to 4 gigabits (8–512 MB) in capacity The cards contain an integrated flash memory for game data and an EEPROM to save user data such as game progress or high scores. However, there are a small number of games that have no save memory such as Electroplankton.

According to an IGN blog by Backbone Entertainment, the developer of MechAssault: Phantom War, larger (such as 128 MB) cards have a 25% slower data transfer rate than the more common smaller (such as 64 MB) cards; however, the specific base rate was not mentioned.

Nintendo DSi Game Card 
In 2008, the Nintendo DSi was launched. The console offered various hardware improvements and additional functions over previous Nintendo DS iterations, such as the inclusion of cameras. While many Nintendo DS titles released afterwards included features that enhanced gameplay when played on the Nintendo DSi console, most of these games retained compatibility with the original DS iterations. However, a select few retail game titles were released that worked exclusively for the Nintendo DSi consoles for reasons such as requiring camera functions, and these titles have game cards with white-colored casings (all DSi-exclusive games are region locked). Examples of such game cards include Picture Perfect Hair Salon. While these white game cards can be physically inserted into original Nintendo DS consoles, their software did not function due to the missing hardware features and will display an error message. These DSi-exclusive game cards are fully compatible with the Nintendo 3DS family.

Prior to the release of the Nintendo DSi, Nintendo encouraged developers to release DSi-exclusive games as DSiWare downloadables instead of retail game cards that would not function on older Nintendo DS consoles.

Infrared support 
Despite all iterations of the Nintendo DS line lacking native infrared support, certain titles made use of this type of communication function using game cards with their own infrared transceivers. These game cards are generally glossier and darker than common Nintendo DS game cards, and reveal their translucency when exposed to light. Examples of such game cards include Personal Trainer: Walking and Active Health With Carol Vorderman, which connect to the included pedometers, Pokémon HeartGold and SoulSilver, which connect to the included Pokéwalker accessory, and Pokémon Black and White and Pokémon Black 2 and White 2, which connect DS systems facing each other.

Although all iterations of the Nintendo 3DS family support native infrared functions, Nintendo DS games still use the infrared-enabled game cards themselves when played on a 3DS system, reserving the native infrared for Nintendo 3DS-specific software.

Nintendo 3DS 
Game cards for the Nintendo 3DS are from 1 to 8 gigabytes in size,  with 2 GB of game data at launch. They look very similar to DS game cards, but are incompatible and have a small tab on one side to prevent them from being inserted into a DS, DS lite, or a DSi.

Nintendo Switch 

The Nintendo Switch uses non-volatile flash memory technology similar to SD cards that are officially called game cards. These are distinct technologies from volatile game cartridges that are similar to RAM boards. This iteration is smaller and has a larger storage capacity than its previous versions. Despite its similarities, the Switch is not compatible with DS and 3DS cards. The game cards used in the Switch are non-writable and save data are stored in the console's internal memory, unlike DS and 3DS game cards, which are writable and able to store save data.

Because of their small size, Nintendo Switch game cards are coated with denatonium benzoate, a non-toxic bitterant, as a safety precaution against accidental consumption by young children. Videos of users intentionally tasting game cards and reacting with disgust at the taste became a meme prior to the console's launch, which originated from Jeff Gerstmann's actions on a Giant Bomb webcast.

The cards come in a variety of capacities: 1 GB, 2 GB, 4 GB, 8 GB, 16 GB, 32 GB and 64 GB. 64 GB cards were planned to be introduced in the second half of 2018, but due to unspecified circumstances, Nintendo delayed the launch of this variant to 2019, and then delayed it again to 2020. The 64 GB cards were then released in 2020 after being delayed for two years and are made using XtraROM technology from Macronix.

References 

Nintendo 3DS
Nintendo hardware
Nintendo Switch
Products introduced in 2004
Video game distribution
Video game storage media